The Bucknell Bison women's basketball team is the college basketball program representing Bucknell University in Lewisburg, Pennsylvania. The Bison currently participate as part of the NCAA Division I basketball, and compete in the Patriot League. The Bison currently play their home games at the Sojka Pavilion.

History
As of the 2015–16 season, the Bison have an all-time record of 499–593. They played in the East Coast Conference from 1982 to 1990 before joining the Patriot League in 1990. They played in their first NCAA Tournament in 2002 after winning the Patriot League Tournament. In the First Round, they lost to Baylor 80–56. In 2008, they qualified again for the Tournament after winning the Patriot League title, though they lost to North Carolina 85–50 in the First Round. Since playing in the Patriot League beginning in 1990, they have a 193–169 record in the conference.

NCAA tournament results
Bucknell has made the NCAA Division I women's basketball tournament once. They have a record of 0-4.

References

External links